Stéphanie Balmir Villedrouin (born 29 March 1982) is a Haitian entrepreneur who formerly served as the minister of tourism of Haiti.

Early years
Villedrouin comes from a prominent Haitian family; the seventh child of Alix Balmir, a diplomat, and his wife, Gladys Dubousquet, a native of the city of Gonaïves, Haiti; both of her parents are mixed-race. She was born abroad in Caracas while her father was serving in diplomatic relations as the Ambassador of Haiti in Venezuela. Two months later her father was designated to the Haitian Embassy in Colombia, wherein Villedrouin spent her early childhood. After the fall of the Jean-Claude Duvalier’s regime, in 1986, the whole family returned to Haiti and established restaurants and hotels.

Villedrouin was four years old when her family returned to Haiti, where she completed her schooling in Port-au-Prince. Then, she studied hospitality and tourism management at the Pontificia Universidad Católica Madre y Maestra, in Santiago, Dominican Republic; she managed a hotel in Kenscoff, a mountainous hamlet located 10 kilometres to the southeast of Port-au-Prince. She is fluent in French and Haitian Creole, as well as in Spanish and English.

Minister of Tourism
Her first term as the Minister of Tourism of Haiti was from 20 October 2011 to 2 April 2014. Rebranded as the Minister of Tourism and Creative Industries, Madame Villedrouin was re-confirmed to a second term on 2 April 2014 and served until 23 March 2016.

During her tenure, Haiti inaugurated its first Tourism Promotion Office.

Personal life
In 2003, she married Marcel Bernard Villedrouin and they have three children together.

References

Living people
1982 births
Politicians from Caracas
People from Port-au-Prince
Tourism ministers of Haiti
Pontificia Universidad Católica Madre y Maestra alumni
Women government ministers of Haiti
Haitian people of Mulatto descent
21st-century Haitian women politicians
21st-century Haitian politicians